Roandeau Albert Henry Bickford-Smith (3 May 1859 – 1916) was an English barrister and antiquary, the author of Greece under King George (1893), once a standard work on 19th century Greek history.

Early life
Roandeau Albert Henry Bickford-Smith was born in Trevarno on 3 May 1859, the son of William Bickford-Smith (1827–99), member of Parliament for Truro, Cornwall. He graduated in law from Trinity College, Cambridge University, in 1883, and received his Masters of Arts degree in 1886.

Career
Bickford-Smith became a member of the Inner Temple in 1882 and was called to the bar in 1886.

His 1893 book, Greece under King George was translated into Greek in 1993.

He was a fellow of the Society of Antiquaries of London.

Family
In 1891, Bickford-Smith married Caroline Louise Marianne Skinner (1873–1936). They had three children, John Allan, William Nugent Venning and Aubrey Luis.

Death
Bickford-Smith died in 1916.

Selected publications
 Greece under King George. R. Bentley, London, 1893.

References

External links

 http://www.materialtexts.bbk.ac.uk/?p=343
 https://www.academia.edu/4774436/Like_a_Rolling_Stone_R.A.H._Bickford-Smith_from_Britain_to_Greece_in_the_Last_Quarter_of_the_XIX_century

1859 births
1916 deaths
Alumni of Trinity College, Cambridge
RAH
Writers from Cornwall
English barristers
19th-century English historians
Fellows of the Society of Antiquaries of London
Historians of Greece
Members of the Inner Temple
19th-century English lawyers